Aaron Jones may refer to:

 Aaron Jones (defensive end) (born 1966), American football player
 Aaron Jones (running back) (born 1994), American football player
 Aaron Jones (basketball) (born 1993), American basketball player
 Aaron Jones (cricketer) (born 1994), Barbadian cricketer
 Aaron Jones (footballer, born 1881) (1881–1954), English footballer
 Aaron Jones (footballer, born 1994), English footballer
 Aaron Jones (musician), member of Scottish band Old Blind Dogs